The Eleventh Tiger is a BBC Books original novel written by David A. McIntee and based on the long-running British science fiction television series Doctor Who. It features the First Doctor, Ian, Barbara, and Vicki.

Synopsis
It is China in 1865. Strife and rebellion rock the land. Trying to maintain order is the British Empire and the martial arts expert, the Ten Tigers of Canton. Adding to the confusion is the impossibility of many people already knowing Ian.

Continuity
Although it is never expressly identified, various clues suggest that the energy being the Doctor and his allies faced here was the Mandragora Helix, which fought the Fourth Doctor in the fifteenth century in The Masque of Mandragora; the Tenth Doctor confirmed its presence here when he faced Mandragora again in the New Series Adventures novel Beautiful Chaos.

References

External links
The Cloister Library - The Eleventh Tiger

Fiction set in 1865
Novels set in the 1860s
2004 British novels
2004 science fiction novels
Past Doctor Adventures
First Doctor novels
Novels by David A. McIntee
BBC Books books
Novels set in the Qing dynasty